Bjarne Reuter (born 29 April 1950) is a Danish writer and screenwriter best known for children's and young adult fiction.
Many of his works are set in the 1950s and 1960s, the time of his childhood and adolescence. Many also feature the Copenhagen area, where he was born in Brønshøj. Reuter is the screenwriter of the popular Danish television series and movie Busters verden ("Buster's World").

In 1977 he was awarded with the Danish Ministry of Culture's children book prize. He won the Deutscher Jugendliteraturpreis for best children's book in 2000, recognising the German-language edition of En som Hodder (1998), and was a finalist for the youth book prize in 2003, for the work published in English as The Ring of the Slave Prince (2004).

For his lasting contribution as a children's writer, Reuter was a finalist for the biennial, international Hans Christian Andersen Award in both 2002 and 2004.

Selected publications in English
Buster's World (1989)
Buster the Sheikh of Hope Street (1991)
The Boys from St. Petri (1994)
The Ring of the Slave Prince (2003)

Publications
1975 Kidnapning (children's book)
1975 Rent guld i posen (children's book)
1976 En dag i Hector Hansens liv
1976 Ridder af skraldespanden (children's book)
1976 Rottefængeren fra Hameln (children's book)
1977 Den største nar i verden (children's book)
1977 Det skøre land (children's book)
1977 Eventyret om den tapre Hu (children's book)
1977 Skønheden og uhyret (children's book)
1977 Tre engle og fem løver (children's book)
1977 Zappa
1978 De seks tjenere (children's book)
1978 Den utilfredse prins (children's book)
1978 Drengen der ikke kunne blive bange (children's book)
1978 Slusernes kejser
1979 Busters verden (children's book)
1979 Børnenes julekalender (children's book)
1979 Den fredag Osvald blev usynlig (children's book)
1979 Rejsen til morgenrødens hav (children's book)
1979 Støvet på en sommerfugls vinge
1980 Før det lysner (short stories)
1980 Kolumbine & Harlekin (children's book)
1980 Kys stjernerne (children's book)
1980 Suzanne & Leonard
1981 Knud, Otto og Carmen Rosita
1981 Skibene i skovene
1982 Abdulahs juveler (children's book)
1982 Det forkerte barn (short stories)
1982 Hvor regnbuen ender (children's book)
1982 Østen for solen og vesten for månen (children's book)
1983 Casanova
1983 Når snerlen blomstrer
1984 Malte-Pøs i Den Store Vide Verden (children's book)
1984 Tre skuespil (drama)
1984 Tropicana
1985 Bundhu
1985 Da solen skulle sælges (children's book)
1985 Shamran - den som kommer
1986 De andre historier (short stories)
1986 En tro kopi
1986 Natten i Safarihulen (children's book)
1987 Den dobbelte mand
1987 Drømmenes bro (children's book)
1987 Os to, Oskar... for evigt (children's book)
1987 Vendetta
1988 Den cubanske kabale
1988 Månen over Bella Bio
1989 Den skæggede dame (children's book)
1989 Peter Pan (children's book)
1989 Vi der valgte mælkevejen
1990 3 til Bermudos
1990 Mig og Albinoni
1991 Drengene fra Sankt Petri
1991 Lola
1992 7.A.
1992 En rem af huden
1992 Kaptajn Bimse & Goggeletten (children's book)
1993 Den korsikanske bisp
1993 Johnny & The Hurricanes
1994 Anna Havanna (children's book)
1995 Langebro med løbende figurer
1996 Anna Havanna, Kaptajn Bimse og alle de andre (children's book)
1996 Ved profetens skæg
1997 Fakiren fra Bilbao
1998 En som Hodder (children's book)
1998 Mikado
1999 Mordet på Leon Culman
1999 Under kometens hale
1999 Willys fars bil (children's book)
2000 Prins Faisals ring; "The Ring of the Slave Prince", English translation by Tiina Nunnally (2004)
2002 Barolo Kvartetten
2002 Kaptajn Bimse i Saltimbocca (children's book)
2003 Kaptajn Bimses jul (children's book)
2004 Løgnhalsen fra Umbrien
2006 Halvvejen til Rafael(Novel)
2007 Skyggernes hus
2008 Fem
2008 Den iranske gartner
2010 Den egyptiske tenor

References

Sources
Lexopen

External links
 

1950 births
Living people
Danish children's writers
Danish male screenwriters
Writers from Copenhagen